The 38th Gawad Urian Awards or Ika-38 na Gawad Urian was held on June 16, 2015 at Studio 10 of ABS-CBN. They honored the best Filipino films for the year 2014. It was also aired live at Cinema One channel.

Nominations were announced on May 20. Barber's Tales and Dagitab received the most nominations with eleven.

Mula sa Kung Ano ang Noon won most of the awards  with four, including Best Film. The Natatanging Gawad Urian was given to Nora Aunor. The ceremony paid tributes to the late directors Lamberto Avellana and Manuel Conde for their 100th birth anniversaries.

Winners and nominees

Multiple nominations and awards

References

External links
 Official Website of the Manunuri ng Pelikulang Pilipino

Gawad Urian Awards
2014 film awards
2015 in Philippine cinema